Rameshwari Nehru (née Rameshwari Raina; 10 December 1886 – 8 November 1966) was a social worker of India. She worked for the upliftment of the poorer classes and of women. In 1902, she married Brijlal Nehru, a nephew of Motilal Nehru and cousin of the first prime minister of independent India, Jawaharlal Nehru. Her son Braj Kumar Nehru was an Indian civil servant who served as governor of several states.

She edited Stri Darpan, a Hindi monthly for women, from 1909 to 1924. She was one of the founders of All India Women's Conference (AIWC) and was elected its president in 1942. She led delegations to the World Women's Congress in Copenhagen and the first Afro-Asian Women's Conference in Cairo (1961).

Nehru was awarded the Padma Bhushan by the Government of India for her social work, in 1955, and won the Lenin Peace Prize in 1961.

References

Further reading
 
 «View of I primi passi del femminismo indiano: Rameshwari e Uma Nehru nell’India di inizio Novecento | Storia delle Donne», 10 luglio 2020. https://oaj.fupress.net/index.php/sdd/article/view/2520/2520.

1886 births
1966 deaths
Nehru–Gandhi family
Recipients of the Padma Bhushan in social work
Women Indian independence activists
Indian women's rights activists
Indian independence activists from Delhi
Social workers
20th-century Indian educators
19th-century Indian women
19th-century Indian people
20th-century Indian journalists
Indian women journalists
Indian women publishers
Indian publishers (people)
Women writers from Delhi
Journalists from Delhi
Social workers from Delhi
Women educators from Delhi
Educators from Delhi
20th-century women educators